Revolutionary Communist Party (in Turkish: Devrimci Komünist Partisi) was a clandestine communist party in Turkey. DKP was formed following the third congress of Communist Party of Turkey/Unity (TKP/B), which was held in Greece in 1989. The founder of DKP was the general secretary of TKP/B, İbrahim Seven. Seven became the general secretary of DKP.

DKP was dissolved in 1991. A major part of the cadre joined the Revolution Party of Turkey (TDP).

See also
List of illegal political parties in Turkey
Communist Party of Turkey (disambiguation), for other groups using similar names

1989 establishments in Turkey
1991 disestablishments in Turkey
Clandestine groups
Defunct communist parties in Turkey
Political parties disestablished in 1991
Political parties established in 1989